Nikola Lukić (Serbian Cyrillic: Никола Лукић; born 14 May 1990) is a Serbian footballer.

Career
In 2010, he moved to Zemun. He then moved to Metalac Gornji Milanovac. In 2012, he moved to Radnički Niš. He was also member of Belarusian Premier League club Minsk and Serbian SuperLiga club Voždovac.

Notes

External links
 
 Nikola Lukić Stats at utakmica.rs

1990 births
Living people
Footballers from Belgrade
Serbian footballers
Association football midfielders
Serbian expatriate footballers
Expatriate footballers in Belarus
Serbian expatriate sportspeople in Belarus
Expatriate footballers in Slovakia
Serbian expatriate sportspeople in Slovakia
Serbian First League players
Serbian SuperLiga players
FK Zemun players
FK Srem Jakovo players
FK Radnički Niš players
FK Metalac Gornji Milanovac players
FC Minsk players
MFK Zemplín Michalovce players
Slovak Super Liga players
FK Voždovac players
FC Dinamo Minsk players
FK Zlatibor Čajetina players